Harold Henry F. Hobbis (born 9 March 1913 in Dartford, Kent, England), was an English international footballer who played as a midfielder in the Football League. Playing most of his career for Charlton Athletic he also appeared as a guest player for West Ham United in World War II.

References

External links

1913 births
1991 deaths
English footballers
Sportspeople from Dartford
Association football midfielders
Charlton Athletic F.C. players
Bromley F.C. players
Tonbridge Angels F.C. players
England international footballers
English Football League players
West Ham United F.C. wartime guest players
Brentford F.C. wartime guest players